Village of Twilight is a 1984 role-playing game adventure for Chill published by Pacesetter.

Contents
Village of Twilight is an adventure which has members of S.A.V.E. (the player characters) heading an expedition into the jungles of southern Mexico on the trail of a beast from the Unknown.

Reception
Jerry Epperson reviewed Village of Twilight in Space Gamer No. 71. Epperson commented that "If Village of Twilight is a model of what we can expect from Pacesetter in the future, then they will have no problem obtaining a reserved spot on every gamer's shelf.  I definitely recommend it to those who purchased the original Chill game and thought the introductory adventure included with the game, "Terror in Warwick House," was terrible.  Village of Twilight more than makes amends."

Angus M McLellan reviewed Village of Twilight for White Dwarf #61, giving it an overall rating of 6 out of 10, and stated that "Village of Twilight is a well written Chill scenario, but it's little use for anything else; so unless you enjoy Chill, I can't really recommend it, but I'd be interested to see a second edition."

Reviews
Different Worlds #37 (Nov./Dec., 1984)
 Casus Belli #40 (Oct 1987)

References

Chill (role-playing game)
Role-playing game adventures
Role-playing game supplements introduced in 1984